Mammals is a 2022 British black comedy streaming television series, which premiered on Prime Video on 11 November 2022. It is written by Jez Butterworth and directed by Stephanie Laing. It stars James Corden, Melia Kreiling, Colin Morgan and Sally Hawkins in pivotal roles. Produced by Street Hassle in association with Vertigo Films and Fulwell 73, the series explores the complexities of modern marriage.

Plot 
Jamie is a successful Michelin-starred chef whose world implodes when he discovers some shocking secrets about his pregnant wife, Amandine. Jamie hunts for answers with the help of his brother-in-law Jeff. Through this hunt, the cracks in Jeff's marriage to Jamie's sister Lue also widen. Jeff tries to get through to Lue, but this only makes Lue descend deeper into a secret fantasy world.

Cast 
 James Corden as Jamie
 Melia Kreiling as Amandine
 Colin Morgan as Jeff
 Sally Hawkins as Lue
 Henry Lloyd-Hughes as Jack
 Samuel Anderson as Dan
 Tom Jones as himself

Episodes

Release 
The teaser for Mammals was released on 17 October 2022. The series premiered on Prime Video on 11 November 2022.

Reception 
 Metacritic, which uses a weighted average, assigned a score of 60 out of 100 based on 14 critics, indicating "mixed or average reviews".

References

External links
 

2022 British television series debuts
2020s British black comedy television series
English-language television shows
Amazon Prime Video original programming
Television series about marriage
Television series by Amazon Studios